Jason Danial O'Brien (born 23 November 1969) is an Australian politician.

Born in Sydney, he served in the Royal Australian Navy from 1986 to 1990 as an electrician and was a Cairns City Councillor from 2000 from 2004. A member of the Labor Party, he was electorate officer to Steve Bredhauer, member for Cook and Transport Minister in the Beattie government. In 2004, he was elected to the Legislative Assembly of Queensland, succeeding the retiring Bredhauer in the seat of Cook. Following the 2009 election, he was elected Deputy Speaker. He lost his seat at the 2012 election.

References

1969 births
Living people
Members of the Queensland Legislative Assembly
Australian Labor Party members of the Parliament of Queensland
21st-century Australian politicians